Flint railway station serves the town of Flint in Flintshire, North Wales. It located on the North Wales Coast Line and is managed by Transport for Wales, who provide most of the passenger trains that call here. There are certain Avanti West Coast services that serve the station.

In July 2008, Flint station was voted "Best in UK".

Facilities
The station is staffed through the day, with the ticket office inside the main building on platform 2. A self-service ticket machine is provided for use and for collecting advance purchase tickets. A waiting room is provided on the eastbound side (platform 1), with digital information screens, timetable posters and help points on both platforms. A stepped footbridge connects the two platforms, but step-free access to both sides is provided via a public footpath passing beneath the railway.

Services

Mondays to Saturdays, the station is served by two main routes, both of which run hourly:

On weekdays, Avanti West Coast operate five trains each way per day between Crewe and Holyhead, one of which runs only to Bangor. On Saturdays there is one train each way per day between London Euston and Holyhead, with two trains each way from Crewe to Holyhead, one of which continues to Birmingham New Street.

There are three trains per day each way between Crewe and Holyhead, one of which continues to London Euston.

References

Bibliography

External links

Railway stations in Flintshire
DfT Category E stations
Former London and North Western Railway stations
Railway stations in Great Britain opened in 1848
Railway stations served by Transport for Wales Rail
Railway stations served by Avanti West Coast
Flint, Flintshire
Grade II listed buildings in Flintshire
Grade II listed railway stations in Wales